The Sholan Alliance series is a series of nine science fiction novels written by Scottish author Lisanne Norman.

Books
The Sholan Alliance series consists of:
Turning Point
Fortune's Wheel
Fire Margins
Razor's Edge
Dark Nadir
Stronghold Rising
Between Darkness and Light
Shades of Gray
Circle's End

Turning Point was originally conceived as an independent short story about a black cat walking through the snow. The author has written a number of short stories set within the series' setting.

External links
Author's official site
List of books in the series with a brief synopsis of each
Message board for the series' Official Fan Club

Science fiction book series